Latastia  siebenrocki, also known commonly as Siebenrock's longtail lizard or Siebenrock's long-tailed lizard, is a species of lizard in the family Lacertidae. The species is endemic to  Guinea.

Etymology
The specific name, siebenrocki, is in honor of Austrian herpetologist Friedrich Siebenrock.

Geographic range
L. siebenrocki is found in Conakry, Guinea.

Habitat
The preferred natural habitat of L. siebenrocki is unknown.

Reproduction
L. siebenrocki is oviparous.

References

Further reading
Bauer AM, Günther R (1995). "An Annotated Type Catalogue of the Lacertids (Reptilia: Lacertidae) in the Zoological Museum, Berlin". Mitteilungen aus dem Museum für Naturkunde in Berlin. Zoologisches Museum und Institut für Spezielle Zoologie (Berlin) 71 (1): 37–62. (Latastia siebenrocki, new combination).
Tornier G (1905). "Schildkröten und Eidechsen aus Nordost-Afrika und Arabien. Aus Carlo v. Erlanger's und Oscar Neumann's Forschungsreise". Zoologisches Jahrbücher. Abteilung für Systematik, Geographie und Biologie der Tiere 22: 365–388. (Eremias siebenrocki, new species, pp. 386–388). (in German).

Reptiles described in 1905
Latastia
Endemic fauna of Guinea
Taxa named by Gustav Tornier